Włodzimierz Gąsior (born 17 August 1948) is a Polish professional football manager and former player, who recently was the manager of Ekstraklasa club Stal Mielec.

After his football career, he played for the Chicago Horizons futsal team and was known as Wally Gasior.

Honours

Club
Stal Mielec
Ekstraklasa: 1972–73, 1975–76

References

External links
 
 

1948 births
Ekstraklasa players
Stal Mielec players
Stal Stalowa Wola players
Wisłoka Dębica players
Living people
People from Mielec
Stal Mielec managers
Polish footballers
Polish football managers
Association football midfielders